John Thomas Grimes (April 17, 1869 – January 17, 1964) was an American professional baseball player who played in three games for the St. Louis Browns during the  season. He was born in Baltimore, Maryland and died in San Francisco at the age of 94. At the time of his death, he was the oldest living former major league player. On the 31st of July, Grimes hit six St Louis Browns hitters, setting a National League record that still stands today. John Grimes never pitched professionally again.

References

External links

Major League Baseball pitchers
Baseball players from Baltimore
St. Louis Browns (NL) players
1869 births
1964 deaths
19th-century baseball players
Evansville Brewers players
Wheeling Nailers (baseball) players
People from Woodstock, Maryland